Army Men: RTS is a real-time strategy video game developed by Pandemic Studios and published by The 3DO Company for PlayStation 2, Microsoft Windows and GameCube. The game follows Sarge and his heroes in the Green Army as they fight the Tan Army across a variety of battlefields over the course of 15 campaigns missions, 8 special operation missions and 8 great battles. The game was the final Army Men game from The 3DO Company. The Greenies hit dirt paths, linoleum floors and carpets and weave through flower beds, strewn boxes and toy train sets to collect plastic and electricity to build snipers to clear the field from afar or amass an army that overwhelms the opposition. The plot is loosely based on the movie Apocalypse Now, as the team of Green commandos must hunt down a rogue and apparently insane colonel, Colonel Blintz.

Gameplay 

Army Men: RTS'''s gameplay requires the acquisition and extraction of two resources to build structures, vehicles and soldiers: plastic and electricity. Plastic, required for every construct, is taken from objects such as Frisbees, dog bowls and toys strewn about levels ranging from a front yard to a kitchen counter and even a basement. On destruction of a plastic object, a lump of plastic is left behind until a dump truck, the collector of plastic and electricity, slugs by and vacuums it. Electricity is drawn from batteries, toasters and walkie-talkies. Construction and upgrades of most buildings and some soldiers are contingent on some buildings having been built. For instance, at the onset of the game the resource depot, the processing facility, must be built so that dump trucks have somewhere to unload their collections.

Players use their resources to construct buildings and units. Because both factions have access to the same units, or infantry and vehicles, advantage lies at how they're used. Some buildings assemble vehicles and produce soldiers and others provide defense. Production buildings can be upgraded to produce better units. Infantry troops are cheap to produce but are not as tough, while vehicles tend to be costly. Vehicles range from dump trucks and base-building bulldozers to helicopters, tanks and half-tracks to Dum-dums, suicidal robots armed with firecrackers. Aside from grunts and grenadiers, infantry units have a special tasks: Minesweepers defuse mines, snipers are deadly from distance and mortar men, especially three or more, rain ruination on buildings in short order.

Due to the nature of each unit, players must counter whatever they are facing. Without breaking a sweat, a cadre of snipers could wipe out a battalion of grunts, but snipers would be helpless against a half-track. Countering the half-track with a tank would leave a weakness to choppers. Players must balance strengths and weaknesses of their forces and their opponent's forces with the cost of producing the units.

Level balance can be changed by other factors. Power-ups, which can improve the speed, restore the health, or increase the damage of whichever side finds them first, cause a disparity between the sides. Heroes, powerful versions of the regular infantry, possess greater durability and can cause great substantially more damage than their cohorts before being destroyed. Insects, chiefly ants, act as free units for whichever side is allied with them. The secondary objectives of some single player missions often deal with one of these things.

 Plot 
Similarly to a plot point of game's precursor, Army Men II, the insane Colonel Blintz of the Green army has turned Tan, along with the soldiers under his command. He has also taken control of a suburban home, turning it into his personal fortress. Sarge is called by Colonel Grimm to take it back. He leads the Green Army in breaking through the Tan defenses.

Sarge is accompanied by various members of Bravo Company who secures the front yard, destroys a garden light providing electrical energy to Blintz's factories, and leads an assault on the Tan held front door only to find it locked. Grimm contacts Sarge via radio, and tells him they can enter the house though a basement window. After destroying a base by the window, Sarge and the heroes jump down into the basement.

Once in the Basement Sarge, Riff, Scorch, Hoover, Thick and the newcomer Bullseye travel through the basement fighting giant fire ants. Grimm contacts Sarge and tells him Blintz has sent bombers to kill them. They make it to the stairs and into the kitchen before the bombers arrive. In the kitchen, Sarge oversees the rebuilding of a non-operational Green base under the table and destroys Tan anti-air emplacements before being airlifted to the counter-top. He then leads the Green army in an attack on a factory Blintz built in the sink before moving into the living room.

Here, the heroes secure a PlayStation 2 (a karaoke machine on GameCube's version) which the Tan were using as an energy source. Blintz contacts them through the living room television and tells Sarge they are nothing but playthings. Blintz destroys the PlayStation 2 in a bombing run. Bravo Company then moves to the foot of the stairs where they build another base and escort plastic villagers to safety across the living room.

Sarge and his heroes climb the stairs where they make their way across a bathroom sink whilst being ruthlessly pursued by ants. They jump from the sink only to be captured upon entering the next room. Only Hoover manages to evade capture and assists the Green Army in building a base and assaulting the Tan to free the heroes.

Bravo Company makes it into the attic, and destroys a model train bridge Blintz is using to transport resources into his base for his army. They make their way farther into the attic to find Vikki is already there, having hitched a ride with the air cavalry. She tells them about a train they can take farther into the attic, and the heroes fight their way to the train. Sarge discovers the tan are holding the ant queen, which explains why they were only attacking the Green Army. Sarge can choose whether or not to free her; either way, the Green fight their way to Blintz's main base. Here, Blintz barricades himself in his fortress, and the Green Army must flush him out. In the final cut scene, Sarge peels the tan off Blintz personally, and Grimm congratulates him via radio, promising "cake and ice cream" when he returns.

 Multiplayer 
The PC version of Army Men: RTS allows for multiplayer with up to eight people. A copy of GameSpy Arcade was bundled with the game (which has since been discontinued). Players can team up in multiplayer matches, or the battle can be a free-for-all. Victory occurs when the opposing side has no headquarters and cannot build one in three minutes. Aside from GameSpy Arcade, connections can be made on a LAN, or through a direct connection between players.

 Reception Army Men: RTS'' received "mixed or average" reviews, according to video game review aggregator Metacritic.

Notes

References

External links 
 
 

2002 video games
Army Men
GameCube games
Multiplayer and single-player video games
Pandemic Studios games
PlayStation 2 games
Real-time strategy video games
Windows games
The 3DO Company games
Cancelled Xbox games
Video games developed in Australia
Global Star Software games